Dimethylaminophosphorus dichloride is an organophosphorus compound with the formula Me2NPCl2 (Me = methyl).  A colorless liquid, it is a reagent in the preparation of other organophosphorus compounds.  Many analogous compounds can be prepared from the reactions of secondary amines and phosphorus trichloride:
2 R2NH  +  PCl3  →  R2NPCl2  +  R2NH2Cl

Reactions
Further equivalents of amine react with dialkylaminophosphorus dichlorides:
2 R2NH  +  R2NPCl2  →  (R2N)2PCl  +  R2NH2Cl

Since the P-NR2 bond is not attacked by Grignard reagents, dimethylaminophosphorus dichloride can be selectively dimethylated:
2 MeMgBr  +  Me2NPCl2  →  Me2NPMe2  +  2 MgBrCl
The resulting dimethylphosphino derivative, a structural relative of tetramethylhydrazine, reacts with hydrogen chloride to give chlorodimethylphosphine:
Me2NPMe2  +  2 HCl  →  ClPMe2  +  Me2NH2Cl

References

Phosphines